John H. Druffel (February 6, 1886 – May 16, 1967) was a United States district judge of the United States District Court for the Southern District of Ohio.

Education and career

Born in Cincinnati, Ohio, Druffel attended the YMCA Law School (then located in Cincinnati, now the Salmon P. Chase College of Law at Northern Kentucky University) in 1911. He was in private practice in Cincinnati from 1912 to 1932. He was Vice Mayor and a member of the Cincinnati City Council from 1929 to 1932. He was a Judge of the Court of Common Pleas of Hamilton County, Ohio from 1933 to 1937.

Federal judicial service

Formally nominated to the same seat by President Roosevelt on November 16, 1937, he was confirmed by the United States Senate on December 8, 1937, and received his commission on December 14, 1937. He assumed senior status on September 30, 1961, serving in that capacity until his death on May 16, 1967.

References

Sources
 

1886 births
1967 deaths
Ohio state court judges
Judges of the United States District Court for the Southern District of Ohio
United States district court judges appointed by Franklin D. Roosevelt
20th-century American judges
Salmon P. Chase College of Law alumni
Cincinnati City Council members